The 1974 Baltimore Orioles season in American baseball involved the Orioles finishing first in the American League East with a record of 91 wins and 71 losses. The Orioles went on to lose to the Oakland Athletics in the 1974 American League Championship Series, 3 games to 1.

Offseason 
 December 4, 1973: Merv Rettenmund, Junior Kennedy and Bill Wood (minors) were traded by the Orioles to the Cincinnati Reds for Ross Grimsley and Wally Williams (minors).
 December 10, 1973: Dennis Martínez was signed by the Baltimore Orioles as an amateur free agent.

Regular season 
Much of the success of the team can be attributed to its infield. second baseman Bobby Grich, shortstop Mark Belanger and third baseman Brooks Robinson each led the American League for their positions in assists.

Season standings

Record vs. opponents

Notable transactions 
 June 5, 1974: Rich Dauer was drafted by the Orioles in the 1st round (24th pick) of the 1974 Major League Baseball Draft.
 September 11, 1974: The Orioles traded a player to be named later and cash to the California Angels for Bob Oliver. The Orioles completed the trade by sending Mickey Scott to the Angels on October 3.
 September 16, 1974: Jim Northrup was purchased by the Orioles from the Montreal Expos.

Roster

Player stats

Batting

Starters by position 
Note: Pos = Position; G = Games played; AB = At bats; H = Hits; Avg. = Batting average; HR = Home runs; RBI = Runs batted in

Other batters 
Note: G = Games played; AB = At bats; H = Hits; Avg. = Batting average; HR = Home runs; RBI = Runs batted in

Pitching

Starting pitchers 
Note: G = Games pitched; IP = Innings pitched; W = Wins; L = Losses; ERA = Earned run average; SO = Strikeouts

Other pitchers 
Note: G = Games pitched; IP = Innings pitched; W = Wins; L = Losses; ERA = Earned run average; SO = Strikeouts

Relief pitchers 
Note: G = Games pitched; W = Wins; L = Losses; SV = Saves; ERA = Earned run average; SO = Strikeouts

Postseason

ALCS 

The Athletics defeated the Orioles, 3–1, limiting Baltimore to one run in the final three games.

As division champions, the Orioles earned a postseason bonus of $7,394 each.

Farm system 

LEAGUE CHAMPIONS: Rochester

Notes

References 

1974 Baltimore Orioles team page at Baseball Reference
1974 Baltimore Orioles season at baseball-almanac.com

Baltimore Orioles seasons
Baltimore Orioles season
American League East champion seasons
Baltimore Orioles